Frank Kojo Baffoe Jr. (known as Kojo Baffoe) is a writer, poet, blogger, media consultant (television and print), producer, columnist, former editor of Destiny Man, and is currently based in Johannesburg, South Africa.

Early life
Kojo was born 10 April 1972 in Munich, Germany to a Ghanaian father and German mother. His father, Frank Baffoe was a business man and diplomat based in Lesotho. He grew up in Maseru, Lesotho, where he finished his schooling at Machabeng High School in 1990. He then spent the following year as an exchange student back in his country of birth. In 1992 he moved to Durban, KwaZulu-Natal, South Africa to study for a Bachelor of Commerce degree at the University of KwaZulu-Natal, after which he moved back to Lesotho and was part of numerous family-run business ventures.

Back to South Africa
In the early 2000s Kojo came back to South Africa and consulted on various ventures and businesses; he then founded Baffoe Kakana (Baka) IT Consulting and later Monstafunk Productions. He then went on to work as a producer on Making Moves (which won a Golden Horn for Best Educational Programme at the SAFTAs), Content Producer on Zwahashu, Afro Café, Zooming in on Men.

Poetry
Kojo's first attempts at poetry were at the Jungle Connection in 1999 in Doornfontein, Johannesburg  which is where he started to learn the craft of performance and not just "getting onto stages and mumbling poetry" or "merely just reciting of words" as he puts it.

Poetry Performance
Highlights of his performances include:
 CIDA City Campus Mini Concert, 2003
 British Council SA presents The Writers Ball, 2004 
 Urban Voices Poetry Festival, 2005
 Voices In My Head Pre-Launch, 2005
 Dialogue with former President Thabo Mbeki, GIBS, 2006
 Poetry Africa SlamJam (only in Joburg Show), Oct 2006
 Arts Alive Speak Your Mind
 Hammer & Tongue Poetry Slam Tour, 13 cities in the United Kingdom, Nov – Dec 2006 
 Jozi Spoken Word Festival, 2007

Along with performing Kojo has facilitated various workshops and been part of several poetry commissions up till his hiatus from 2008 till early 2013.

Print and digital media
Kojo was founding editor of Blaque Magazine in 2008, a columnist for City Press (South Africa) between 2009 and 2011, and has been the editor of Destiny Man since August 2010. Kojo has been an avid blogger, with Infinite Pursuit on Blogspot, KojoBaffoe on WordPress, KojoBaffoe on Tumblr (to name a few), and finally settling on his own website KojoBaffoe.com while still being active on various social networks. He recently published a collection of autobiographical short stories by Pan Macmillan South Africa called Listen to Your Footsteps.

For me, they are other platforms for communicating and for writing. My blogs were an opportunity to write regularly and share content. Social media is great for understanding people and society, for story ideas, for debate and engagement, for the sharing of thoughts, etc. ~ Kojo

See also
Destiny Magazine
Khanyi Dhlomo

References

External links
 
 
 

South African journalists
South African male poets
South African editors
South African magazine editors
1972 births
Living people
21st-century South African poets
20th-century South African poets
20th-century South African male writers
21st-century South African male writers